Tan Tiancheng (Pinyin: Tán Tiānchéng; born 15 May 1991 in Taiyuan) is a Chinese footballer who plays as a striker for Zibo Qisheng in China League Two.

Club career
Tan started his senior career in 2009 with Beijing Guoan. He made his debut in a league match against Qingdao Jonoon on 27 September.

Tan was loaned to Beijing's satellite team Beijing Guoan Talent which would play as a foreign team in Singapore's S.League in 2010. He scored his first senior league goal on his first appearance, in a 3-1 away win against Geylang United on 12 March. He returned to Beijing Guoan in July. In July 2013, he was loan to China League Two side Lijiang Jiayunhao until 31 December 2013.

Tan transferred to China League Two side Yinchuan Helanshan in March 2016. He made a promising performances for the club in the 2016 and 2017 season, scoring 22 goals in 49 appearances.

On 10 February 2018, Tan transferred to Chinese Super League side Changchun Yatai.

International career
Tan was called up into China U-20's squad in 2009. He scored 3 goals in 5 matches in 2010 AFC U-19 Championship qualification.

Career statistics 
Statistics accurate as of match played 31 December 2020.

Honours

Club
Changchun Yatai
 China League One: 2020

References

External links

1991 births
Living people
Sportspeople from Taiyuan
Chinese footballers
Footballers from Shanxi
Beijing Guoan F.C. players
Yunnan Flying Tigers F.C. players
Changchun Yatai F.C. players
Chinese Super League players
China League One players
China League Two players
Singapore Premier League players
Association football forwards